Greg Ford may refer to:

Greg Ford (cricketer) (born 1992), Irish cricketer
Greg Ford, (born 1973), American educator and politician
Greg Ford (born 1954), American animator and director